The 1978 New Mexico Lobos football team was an American football team that represented the University of New Mexico in the Western Athletic Conference (WAC) during the 1978 NCAA Division I-A football season.  In their fifth season under head coach Bill Mondt, the Lobos compiled a 7–5 record (3–3 against WAC opponents) and outscored opponents by a total of 284 to 205. 

The team's statistical leaders included Brad Wright with 1,925 passing yards, Mike Williams with 1,015 rushing yards, Ricky Martin with 594 receiving yards, and kicker Alan Moore with 64 points scored.

Schedule

References

New Mexico
New Mexico Lobos football seasons
New Mexico Lobos football